Mcmurdodus is an extinct genus of sharks and the sole member of the family Mcmurdodontidae, in the order Hexanchiformes. It contains two extinct species.

Species
 Mcmurdodus featherensis White, 1968
 Mcmurdodus whitei Turner, & Young, 1987

References

Devonian sharks
Hexanchiformes
Prehistoric fish of Australia